Chipindo is a town and municipality, with a population of 64,714 (2014 census), in the province of Huíla, Angola.

It is situated 450 km North of Lubango, Huila province capital.

Geography & Territory 
With an extension of 4.038 km2, and a population density of 19 per km2, it is limited with the towns of Caála and Tchicala Tcholoanga in Huambo Province in the North, with Jamba town in the South, with Kuvango in the East and with Caconda and Chicomba in the West.

Its population is 64,714 at the 2014 census, distributed in two communes, Chipindo Sede and Bambi, that are constituted by seven regedorías, Tchitata, Camoanha, Sangueve, Capembe e Bundjei (Chipindo Sede), Catapua, Bambi sede (Bambi), and a great number of aldeias in each comuna. During the raining season traffic is strongly reduced due to the bad shape of the roads.

It has a small landing runway.

Climate 
Chipindo has a subtropical highland climate (Köppen: Cwb) with two differentiated seasons, a wet season from October to April and a dry season from May to September. Temperatures are somewhat lower during the dry season.

Population 
Mother tongue of most of the population is Umbundu, spoken by the majority of Umbundu people, although it exist a part of the population belonging to Gangela people, especially in the West, close to Kuvango.  The population is in its majority of strong traditional beliefs.

Administration 
Since the end of the war, for the first time in 14 years, since March 19, 2002, a local administration was established.

COMUNAS 
 CHIPINDO SEDE: town center. Local Administration, police, Catholic church, Health center, School and Hospital (under construction in 2004). Aldea de Mbuandangui: 2 km from Chipindo sede, Action Against Hunger base (as of 2005). Regidurias: Sangueve, Camoanha, Tchitata, Capembe and Bundjei.
 BAMBI: South of the town. Health post.
Regidurias: Catapua, Bambi sede.

SECTOR 
 Bundjei: North of the town. Health center.

References 

Populated places in Huíla Province
Municipalities of Angola